Austin Lewis may refer to:

 Austin Lewis (politician) (born 1932), Australian politician
 Austin Lewis (footballer) (1870–?), Australian rules football player
 Austin Lewis (socialist) (1865?–1944), American socialist, author and lawyer

See also